This is a sub-article of Durham School.
Durham School, tracing its history back to Langley in 1414 and earlier, has had a number of Headmasters (but, to date, no Headmistresses).

1414 to 1541
This incomplete list comes from The Durham School Register, 1991. The list is derived from The Account Rolls of the Receiver General which show that two chaplains, the forerunners of the Headmasters, were paid, one for the Langley Grammar School (which became Durham School) and one for the Langley Song School (which became the Chorister School). They do not make it clear which chaplain was for which school however, so two names are often given here.

1414 - William Browne
1416 to 1419 - John Claiton  John Arteys (or Ortas
1424 to 1435 - John Arteys
1438 to 1439 - John Arteys  Robert Sotheron
1453 to 1461 - Robert Sotheron  Robert Grene
1464 to 1466 - Robert Sotheron  John Spicer
1466 to 1467 - Robert Sotheron  Nicholas Kelchith
1467 to 1479 - Robert Sotheron  Hugh Forster
1479 to 1480(?) - James Eversleet  William Dosse
1484 to 1497 - Thomas Todd  William Dosse
1504 to 1511 - John Hochonson (or Hotchinson)  William Dosse
1511 to 1512 - Thomas Sanderson
1512 to 1513 - Thomas Sanderson  William Watson
1513 to 1519 - Thomas Sanderson  Edward Watson
1520 to 1521 - Thomas Sanderson  George Fowberry
1523 to 1529 - William Cokey  George Fowberry
1529 to 1535 - William Cokey  Ralph Todd
1537 to 1541 - William Cokey  Henry Stafford

1541 to 1844
This list comes from The Durham School Register supplemented as indicated.

After the Dissolution in 1541, Henry VIII reconstituted the school.

 ... to 1546 (or earlier) - Henry Stafford
1546 (or earlier) to 1558 - Robert Hartburn
1158 to 1568 - Thomas Reve
1568 to 1579 - Robert Cooke
1579 to 1593 - Francis Kaye
1593 to 1596 - James Caufield (after his resignation the school was, for some months, in the charge of the undermaster, R. Bolton)
1597 to 1609 - Peter Smart
1610 to 1613 - Thomas Ingmethorpe
1614 to 1628 - Nicholas Walton
1629 to 1632 - Thomas Miller
1633 to 1640 - Richard Smelt
1640 to 1666 - Elias Smith
1666/7 to 1690 - Thomas Battersby
1691 to 1699 - Thomas Rudd
1699 to 1703 - Nicholas Burton
1709 to 1711 - Thomas Rudd
1761 to 1768 - Thomas Randall
1839 to ... - Edward Elder

Post-1844
Originally located on Palace Green outside Durham Cathedral, the school moved to its present site in 1844.

Headmasters since then have been:

 ... to 1853 - Edward Elder
 1853 to 1882 - Henry Holden
 1882 to 1884 - William Fearon
 1884 to 1894 - James Marshall
 1894 to 1899 - Walter Hobhouse
 1899 to 1905 - Albert Hillard
 1905 to 1907 - Harry Ward McKenzie
 1907 to 1932 - Richard Budworth (the School sport centre is dedicated to Budworth)
 1932 to 1958 - Henry Kenneth Luce (the School theatre is dedicated to Luce)
 1958 to 1967 - John Brett (the School's inner quadrangle is dedicated to Brett)
 1967 to 1972 - William Birkett Cook
 1972 to 1982 - Michael Vallance (the school's learning support building is named Vallance Building)
 1982 to 1997 - Michael Lang
 1997 to 2008 - Neil Kern
 2008 to 2009 - Derek R. Best (the building that he taught in was renamed the Derek Best Building)
 2009 to 2014 - E. Martin George
 2014 to date - Kieran McLaughlin

References

Durham School
Dunelmians
Headmasters